Dato' Sri Hoh Khai Mun; born 8 August 1955, is a Malaysian politician and was a senator elected by Pahang State Assembly in senator for the 29 May 2015 - 28 May 2018 term.

Hoh is the former state executive council (Exco) member of Pahang who is in charge with local council, health, and the environment. He is the former Pahang state assemblyman of Bilut seat for four terms from 1995 to 2013 before he switched to contest the federal seat of Raub and lost in the 2013 general election. Hoh is also the Malaysian Chinese Association (MCA) party Pahang state chairman and Bentong division chairman.

Early life 
Hoh hails from Bentong, Pahang, Malaysia. He studied at Sekolah Menengah Katholik and went to  University of Malaya later.

Election results

Honours
 :
 Knight Companion of the Order of the Crown of Pahang (D.I.M.P.) – Dato' (2003)
 Knight Companion of the Order of Sultan Ahmad Shah of Pahang (D.S.A.P.) – Dato' (2007)
 Grand Knight of the Order of the Crown of Pahang (S.I.M.P.) – Dato' Indera (2012)
 Grand Knight of the Order of Sultan Ahmad Shah of Pahang (S.S.A.P.) – Dato' Sri (2018)

References

External links 
Hoh Khai Mun Facebook

1955 births
Living people
People from Pahang
Malaysian Chinese Association politicians
Members of the Pahang State Legislative Assembly
Members of the Dewan Negara
Pahang state executive councillors
University of Malaya alumni